This is a list of Roman Catholic churches in Toronto, Ontario, Canada.

The Archdiocese of Toronto covers the city of Toronto and the surrounding areas of the Greater Toronto Area. Toronto is also home to many Eastern Rite churches not part of the archdiocese.

Archdiocese of Toronto

Eastern Rite

See also
List of Anglican churches in Toronto
List of Orthodox churches in Toronto
List of Presbyterian churches in Toronto
List of United Church of Canada churches in Toronto

References
Archdiocese of Toronto
Church of the Holy Protection
Holy Eucharist Ukrainian Catholic Church
Holy Family Coptic
Jesus the King Melkite Catholic Church
St. Demetrius the Great Martyr Ukrainian Catholic Church
St. Gregory the Illuminator Armenian Catholic
St. Mary's Malankara Catholic Church Toronto
St. Nicholas Ukrainian Catholic Church
Sts. Peter and Paul Ukrainian Catholic Church

 
Roman Catholic Archdiocese of Toronto
Religious buildings and structures in Toronto
Churches, Roman Catholic
Toronto, Roman Catholic
Toronto